William John Walker (25 May 1883 – 17 July 1971) was an Australian rules footballer who played for the Fitzroy Football Club in the Victorian Football League (VFL).

A ruck shepherd, Walker was a best and fairest winner at Fitzroy in 1909. He was a member of premiership sides in 1904, 1905 and 1913, the latter as club captain. He was the last surviving player on either team from the 1906 VFL Grand Final.

References

External links

1883 births
Australian rules footballers from Ballarat
Fitzroy Football Club players
Fitzroy Football Club Premiership players
Mitchell Medal winners
1971 deaths
Three-time VFL/AFL Premiership players